Guess Who may refer to:

Guess Who (B.B. King album), 1972
Guess Who (Slim Whitman album), 1971
Guess Who (EP), a 2021 EP by South Korean girl group Itzy
Guess Who (film), a 2005 romantic comedy starring Bernie Mac, Ashton Kutcher and Zoë Saldaña
Guess Who (rapper), a Romanian hip hop artist
Guess Who?, a guessing game made popular by the Milton Bradley Company
"Guess Who", a Goodie Mob song from their debut album, Soul Food (1995)
"Guess Who", a 1966 Tages song from their album Tages 2
The Guess Who, a rock band from Winnipeg, Manitoba, Canada

See also